Valley of the Giants is a 1919 American silent romantic drama film directed by James Cruze and starring Wallace Reid and Grace Darmond. Based on Peter B. Kyne's popular 1918 novel of the same name, the film produced by Famous Players-Lasky and distributed through Paramount Pictures.

Cast

Location
The film was shot on locations in Humboldt County, California.

Preservation
This film was presumed lost for 90 years until 2010 when a print was returned to the United States from Russia's Gosfilmofond archive. Flash titles were in the Russian language. In 2022 Edward Lorusso translated the Russian titles and produced the film for DVD release with a new music score by David Drazin.

See also
Wallace Reid filmography

References

External links

1919 films
1910s English-language films
1919 romantic drama films
American romantic drama films
American silent feature films
American black-and-white films
Famous Players-Lasky films
Films directed by James Cruze
Films based on American novels
Paramount Pictures films
1910s rediscovered films
Rediscovered American films
Silent romantic drama films
1910s American films
Silent American drama films